Dražen Brnčić (born 17 July 1971) is a Croatian football manager and former player who played as a midfielder. He also holds Belgian citizenship.

Playing career
Brnčić started his youth career in SR Croatia but left for Belgium after Croatia declared its independence.

He joined a local side ACHE (Hemptinne-Eghezée) for a year before transferring to Charleroi, where he played regularly in the Belgian First Division and spotted by European teams. He eventually transferred to Serie B side Cremonese, before moving to Lombardy to join Monza. He played 37 Serie B matches for Monza as they were relegated; the next season, he was loaned to Serie B club Vicenza and won promotion to Serie A.

In the 2000–01 season he joined A.C. Milan, but only played one league matches, three Coppa Italia matches and one Champions League match due to injuries.

Before the start of the following season, he was signed by Internazionale as part of the transfer that saw Andrea Pirlo move to Milan. He never played for Inter and spent his two years at the club on loan to Serie B sides Ancona and Venezia.

In June 2003, he was released by Inter and went on trial at Vitesse Arnhem before joining MVV in the Eerste Divisie.

In 2007, he joined Belgian Third Division team Visé, where he played as a defender and scored 4 goals.

Managerial career

In 2012, he became the trainer of RSC Verviers (Belgium third division) for 4 month to maintain club in third division.

In the 2013–14 season with RSC Vervier, he finished in second place. Because of the club did not receive the division 2 license, the team couldn't play the final round to be promoted in second division.

In the 2014–15 season, he was the trainer of Union St Giloise (Belgium third division). He did fantastic work and his team was promoted to the second division.

For the 2015 season, he was the trainer of Patro Maasmechelen (Belgium second division). He decided to stop after 4 months because the club had no ambition.

Now, he is the trainer of Seraing United (Belgium second division). This club has more ambitions and wants to go to the Belgium first division.

Since November 2016 he will take the lead of the fresh reborn RWDM the traditional football club of Molenbeek. The club has a lot of ambition and matches. Under Brnčić leadership the club clinches (easily) two titles a row (2017 and 2018) for climbing from level 5 to level 3 of Belgian football, and knocking on the door of Belgian professional football.

Personal life
Brnčić married a Belgian woman and received Belgian nationality.

References

External links
 Profile at Voetbal International 
 Profile at Visé 
 Profile at Seraing 

Yugoslav footballers
Belgian footballers
Belgian expatriate footballers
Belgian Pro League players
Serie A players
Serie B players
Eerste Divisie players
GNK Dinamo Zagreb players
R. Charleroi S.C. players
U.S. Cremonese players
A.C. Monza players
A.C. Milan players
Inter Milan players
L.R. Vicenza players
A.C. Ancona players
Venezia F.C. players
MVV Maastricht players
Expatriate footballers in Italy
Expatriate footballers in the Netherlands
Association football midfielders
Association football defenders
Footballers from Zagreb
1971 births
Living people
HNK Segesta players
C.S. Visé players
Belgian people of Croatian descent